is an autobahn in southern Germany, connecting the A 7 via Schweinfurt and Bamberg to the A 9.

Exit list 

 

 

  
 

 

  

 

 

  
 

|}

External links 

70
A070